Tiba Saleem Abdulmaged Al-Quraishi (born 13 January 1996) is an Iraqi football and futsal player who plays as a midfielder for Iraqi club Al-Zawraa.

International career
Tiba Al-Quraishi has been capped for Iraq at senior level in both football and futsal.

In football, she represented Iraq in the 2018 AFC Women's Asian Cup qualification in 2017, where she played three games.

In futsal, Tiba Al-Quraishi played for Iraq at the WAFF Women's Futsal Championship in 2022 and scored a goal in the semi-final against Kuwait which helped Iraq reach the final and win the title for the first time in its history.

Honours
Iraq (futsal)
 WAFF Women's Futsal Championship: 2022

See also
 Women's football in Iraq

References

External links
 

1996 births
Living people
Iraqi women's footballers
Iraqi women's futsal players
Women's association football midfielders
Iraq women's international footballers